John Perkins "Pat" Luby (January, 1869 – April 24, 1899), was a professional baseball pitcher in the Major Leagues from 1890 to 1895. Luby played for the Louisville Colonels and Chicago Colts.

See also
 List of baseball players who died during their careers

External links

1869 births
1899 deaths
Major League Baseball pitchers
Louisville Colonels players
Chicago Colts players
19th-century baseball players
Galveston Sand Crabs players
New Orleans Pelicans (baseball) players
Minneapolis Minnies players
Milwaukee Brewers (minor league) players
Toledo White Stockings players
Carbondale Anthracites players
Scranton Coal Heavers players
Baseball players from South Carolina
19th-century deaths from tuberculosis
Tuberculosis deaths in South Carolina